Meriküla is a village in Harku Parish, Harju County in Estonia.

References

Villages in Harju County